Renato Umali Solidum, Jr. is a Filipino geologist and government official who is currently serving as the Secretary of the Department of Science and Technology (DOST) since August 13, 2022. Before his appointment as Secretary, Solidum served as an Undersecretary for Disaster Risk Reduction-Climate Change Adaptation at DOST and as the Officer-in-Charge of the Philippine Institute of Volcanology and Seismology (PHIVOLCS).

Early life and education
Renato Umali Solidum, Jr. hails from the town of Odiongan in Romblon province. He attended high school in his province.

Originally, Solidum aspired to be a civil engineer and he took the entrance examinations of the University of the Philippines. Though he passed the exam, he was ineligible to enroll in an engineering course as it was considered a 'quota course'—with only a limited number of students accepted each year. 

Instead, he pursued a course on geology with the initial intention of later switching to the engineering. However, he decided against it and eventually earned a bachelor's degree in geology.

He also studied in the United States, at the University of Illinois Chicago where he obtained a geological sciences master's degree and at the Scripps Institution of Oceanography of the University of California, San Diego where he got his doctorate degree in Earth sciences.

Career
Solidum has been part of the Philippine Institute of Volcanology and Seismology (PHIVOLCS) in 1984 since it split off from the Philippine Atmospheric, Geophysical, and Astronomical Services Administration (PAGASA). He hired by the organization shortly after graduating from the University of the Philippines and had the endorsement of then-director Raymundo Punongbayan.

He first received international attention in 1991 when PHIVOLCS director Punongbayan tasked him to work with the United States Geological Service gathering data at the then restive Mount Pinatubo. The findings of the team led to Punongbayan to raise an evacuation alert in the area prior to a major volcanic eruption saving thousands of lives in Central Luzon.

He later served in PHIVOLCS as its director from 2003 to 2017 and Officer-in-Charge from March 2017. He was also appointed as Department of Science and Technology (DOST) Undersecretary for Disaster Risk Reduction-Climate Change Adaptation (DRR-CCA). In 2019, he became undersecretary for Scientific and Technical Services.

Solidum was appointed as ad interim DOST Secretary by President Bongbong Marcos on July 22, 2022. 

In recognition of his contributions to disaster risk reduction in the Philippines, Solidum has received numerous awards, including: Presidential Lingkod Bayan (Civil Servant) Award, Presidential Citation for Public Service, Professional of the Year in the field of Geology by the Professional Regulation Commission and the Excellence Award for Government Service by the Philippine Federation of Professional Associations.

Personal life
Solidum is married and has three children.

Notes

References

|-

Secretaries of Science and Technology (Philippines)
Bongbong Marcos administration cabinet members
University of the Philippines alumni
Filipino scientists
People from Romblon
Living people
Year of birth missing (living people)